On 10 March 2010, Scotland's Marine Bill received Royal Assent, making it the Marine (Scotland) Act 2010.

The Marine (Scotland) Act is an Act of the Scottish Parliament which provides a framework which will help balance competing demands on Scotland's seas. It introduces a duty to protect and enhance the marine environment and includes measures to help boost economic investment and growth in areas such as marine renewables.

The main measures include:

Marine planning: a new statutory marine planning system to sustainably manage the increasing, and often conflicting, demands on our seas
Marine licensing: a simpler licensing system, minimising the number of licences required for development in the marine environment to cut bureaucracy and encourage economic investment
Marine conservation: improved marine nature and historic conservation with new powers to protect and manage areas of importance for marine wildlife, habitats and historic monuments
 conservation: much improved protection for seals and a new comprehensive licence system to ensure appropriate management when necessary
Enforcement: a range of enhanced powers of marine conservation and licensing

Stakeholders

Wildlife organisations, such as the Royal Society for the Protection of Birds, welcomed the new laws.
RSPB Scotland: Marine Environment Inquiry / Written evidence to the Environment and Rural Development Committee of the UK Government, December 2006

See also
Scottish Adjacent Waters Boundaries Order 1999 
Marine Scotland, the Scottish Government's marine management directorate
List of Acts of the Scottish Parliament from 1999
Marine Protected Area (MPA)
Conservation biology
Fisheries management, fish farms
Marine conservation
World Commission on Protected Areas
Marine and Coastal Access Act 2009, covering England and Wales

External links
Marine and Fisheries pages Scottish Government website

Acts of the Scottish Parliament 2010
Scottish coast
Environmental law in the United Kingdom
Marine conservation
Renewable energy in Scotland
Town and country planning in Scotland
Environment of Scotland
Economy of Scotland
Regulators of Scotland
Conservation in Scotland
Law enforcement in Scotland
Fishing in Scotland